Events from the year 1771 in Sweden

Incumbents
 Monarch – Adolf Frederick then Gustav III

Events
 12 February – Adolf Frederick, King of Sweden dies, and are succeeded by Gustav III of Sweden (at the time on a visit to France). 
 1 March - The news of the King's death reach Gustav III of Sweden in Paris. 
 30 May - Gustav III of Sweden returns to Sweden as monarch. 
 8 September – The Royal Swedish Academy of Music is created.
 - The Du Londel Troupe is dissolved. 
 - Widespread famine in Sweden following a dry summer and then heavy rains during the late summer and fall, leading to widespread crop failures. 
 - The first newspaper in the Swedish province of Finland, Tidningar utgifne af et Sällskap i Åbo. 
 - Sweden and France creates an alliance. 
 - Foundation of the Royal College of Music, Stockholm.
 - Foundation of the Royal Swedish Society of Naval Sciences.
 - The notorious thief Jacob Guntlack is executed in the capital in front of thousands of spectators.

Births
 23 January – Elisabeth Forsselius, actress  (died 1850)
 Cajsa Wahllund, restaurateur (died 1843)
 Margareta Sofia Lagerqvist, actress and singer  (died 1800)
 Marie Antoinette Petersén, musician  (died 1855)
 Charlotta Roos, fortune teller and medium  (died 1809)
 Anna Leonore König, singer  (died 1854)
 Ulrika Åberg, ballerina  (died 1852)

Deaths
 Niclas Gustaf Duncan, spy (born 1711)
 - Jacob Guntlack, notorious thief  (born 1744)
 - Brigitta Sahlgren, industrialist  (born 1694)

References

 
Years of the 18th century in Sweden
Sweden